Piestus extimus is a species of flat rove beetle in the family Staphylinidae. It is found in Central America and North America.

References

Further reading

External links

 

Piestinae
Articles created by Qbugbot
Beetles described in 1887